Water supply and sanitation in Mali is characterized by serious challenges. Unclean water can lead to many diseases that are potentially fatal. Water supply issues lead to a variety of issues throughout the country.

Childhood diarrhea
Childhood diarrhea is a waterborne disease and is a primary cause of death in the children population of Mali. Many studies have been conducted in order to reduce this problem, but the number of children dying from waterborne diseases in Mali has risen.

Improved hygiene
Studies have shown that improved hygiene has been effective in decreasing the mortality rate, which, in some cases, is as high as 45%.  These studies showed that improved hygiene was twice as effective at reducing waterborne diseases than improved drinking sources, which was unsuccessful due to re-contamination. Re-contamination, in these cases, often occurred in households due to improper water handling and storage. 
Inadequate water, sanitation, and hygiene (WASH) programs have been implemented to improve access to clean water as well as improve hygiene techniques to decrease contamination of water. Improvements to WASH at schools have been shown to reduce diarrheal disease, acute respiratory infections, soil-transmitted infections, and absence among pupils, though results are not consistent between studies. This is due to a number of factors: weak program design, poor program fidelity, limited adherence, or weak evaluation of results, as well as pupil reported outcomes.

Lack of access to water

Agriculture
Agriculture is the number one economic industry in Mali. Mali has been deemed the ‘food basket’ of the West African region. More than 200,000 hectare (2000 km^2) of land is currently leased to use for growing highly water-demanding crops such as rice and sugar cane, which creates a pressing need to improve water management system. Many local Malians are poor subsistence farmers, heavily reliant on natural resources and are vulnerable to environmental issues and lack of accessible water. Poor water management has led to wasteful and inefficient water use, which leads to problems such as degradation of infrastructure, environmental damage, and water accessibility issues for others. Due to increased urbanization and industrial growth, as well as reduced rain fall due to climate change, the inadequacy and limits of water access have been highly. Office du Niger (ON) was created to manage and develop the land and water sources in the area. The ON does not directly handle environmental protection but may intervene if water management systems are affected by environmental problems.

Water pricing
Water pricing is a controversial and politically sensitive subject for many. Large-scale investments in agricultural land (LSIALs) have created many issues for water accessibility and use. A water pricing system that recognizes the economic value of water is crucial to obtain full benefits from these investments, while protecting the livelihood of other users and the environment. This has raised issues in the Office du Niger (ON), where the present water management system relies on a flat rate per hectare pricing. This does not encourage water conservation. The proposed theory is implementing a volumetric water pricing system.

"WASH"
According to best estimates by The United Nations Children’s Fund, only 51% of schools in low-income settings have access to water, and 45% have adequate sanitation facilities

Wells and pumps
Wells serve as the primary source of water for many communities in Mali. Wells are typically left uncovered and untreated as well treatment is regarded as too expensive. This creates many issues of health issues, particularly diarrhea. Hand dug wells are common, and lead to issues such as erosion and contaminated water from the erosion. Standing water surrounding the wells and pumps provides a breeding ground for mosquitos, which create the issue of a breeding ground for malaria. The issue of standing water surrounding wells and pumps can be addressed by installing gravel-pits at the base of wells and pumps, allowing runoff water to soak back into the ground.

Challenges

Open defecation
Open defecation is a common occurrence in Mali. Out of people who do not have access to safe drinking water, over half of them live in rural areas.  Diseases can easily be spread when fecal matter contaminates water sources, such as groundwater. In these cases, villagers can easily consume the contaminated water or use it when preparing food. This may lead to villagers having diarrhea, which can worsen malnutrition, which is already a problem in Mali.

Water quality at public institutions
Water sanitation and quality is also a problem at hospitals in Mali where water is not clean and toilets are not hygienic for women. In fact, these are in the list of the top five killers of women worldwide. Women who are about to deliver are at great risk of complications due to health centers being unable to prevent many infections. They often have to relieve themselves outside because public restrooms are not available. Only 20% of health facilities in Mali were reported to have clean water. The same situation arises when it comes to Malian schools. Only 57 percent of schools provide some sort of sanitation facility, an even smaller percentage of that provides students with separate gender restrooms.

References